Events in the year 1809 in Norway.

Incumbents
Monarch: Frederick VI

Events
10 July – 1,800 men under the command of Major General Georg Frederik von Krogh attacked Jemtland from Norway.
25 July – Christian August of Augustenborg is appointed Steward of Norway.
10 December – The Dano-Swedish War of 1808–09 ends.

Arts and literature
Autumn – Jacob Aall publishes the pamphlet Fædrelandske Ideer where he demands a Norwegian university, national bank and better general education.

Births
24 February – Haagen Ludvig Bergh, politician (d.1852)
23 September – Oluf Steen Julius Berner, politician (d.1885)

Full date unknown
Svend Foyn, whaler (d.1894)
Ludvig Johan Carl Manthey, civil servant (d.1875)

Deaths
3 May – Niels Carlsen, timber merchant, landowner, shipowner and banker (born 1734).
29 July – Evert Andersen, navy officer (b.1772)
9 October – Niels Stockfleth Darre, military officer (b.1765)
27 October – Peter Westerstrøm, mass murderer (b.1779)

Full date unknown
Sveinung Svalastoga, rose painter (b.1772)

See also

References